System x is a line of x86 servers produced by IBM, and later by Lenovo, as a sub-brand of IBM's System brand, alongside IBM Power Systems, IBM System z and IBM System Storage. In addition, IBM System x was the main component of the IBM System Cluster 1350 solution.

In January 2014, IBM announced the sale of its x86 server business to Lenovo for $2.3 billion, in a sale completed October 1, 2014.

History
Starting out with the PS/2 Server, then the IBM PC Server, rebranded Netfinity, then eServer xSeries and finally System x, these servers are distinguished by being based on off-the-shelf x86 CPUs; IBM positioned them as their "low end" or "entry" offering compared to their POWER and Mainframe products.
Previously IBM servers based on AMD Opteron CPUs did not share the xSeries brand; instead they fell directly under the eServer umbrella.  However, later AMD Opteron-based servers did fall under the System x brand.

Predecessors

IBM PS/2 Server
 IBM PS/2 Server 85 (Type 9585), 1992
 IBM PS/2 Server 95 (Types 8595, 9595, 9595A), 1990–1992
 IBM PS/2 Server 195, 1993
 IBM PS/2 Server 295, 1992

IBM PC Server

PC Server range
 IBM PC Server 300, 1994
 IBM PC Server 310 (PCI/ISA), 1996
 IBM PC Server 315 (PCI/ISA), 1996
 IBM PC Server 320 (PCI/EISA), 1996
 IBM PC Server 325 (PCI/EISA), 1996
 IBM PC Server 330 (PCI/EISA), 1997
 IBM PC Server 500 (MCA), 1994
 IBM PC Server 520 (PCI/EISA or PCI/MCA), 1995-1996
 IBM PC Server 704 (PCI/EISA), 1996
 IBM PC Server 720 (PCI/MCA), 1995-1996

Numbering scheme
 300 range for high-volume, entry level servers
 500 range for midrange
 700 range for high-end.

IBM Netfinity

1998–2001 server line; Not to be confused with a software IBM product with a similar name, NetFinity (notice the capital F).

Netfinity range
 IBM Netfinity 1000
 IBM Netfinity 3000, 3500
 IBM Netfinity 4000R, 4500R
 IBM Netfinity 5000, 5100, 5500, 5500-M10, 5500-M20, 5600
 IBM Netfinity 6000R
 IBM Netfinity 7000, 7000-M10, 7100, 7600
 IBM Netfinity 8500R

Numbering scheme
The numbering scheme started off similar to that of the IBM PC Servers, but additional ranges were added, like the entry-level 1000 model later on. Models ending with an R, are rack-mount.

KVM cabling scheme
Some Netfinity servers used IBM's C2T cabling scheme for Keyboard/Video/Mouse.

IBM eServer

IBM eServer range
IBM eServer was a marketing effort to put all of the diverse IBM server platforms under one header. The AS/400 became the IBM eServer iSeries, the RS/6000 became the IBM eServer pSeries, the S/390 mainframe became the IBM eServer zSeries and the Intel processor based IBM Netfinity servers became the IBM eServer xSeries.

A few exceptions were however made
 IBM eServer 325, 326, 326m
 IBM eServer BladeCenter, BladeCenter T, BladeCenter H, BladeCenter HT

Numbering scheme
For marketing reasons the AMD processor based e325, e326 and e326m and the BladeCenter which supports non-Intel processor products were not branded xSeries, but were instead placed directly under the eServer brand. The xSeries brand was limited to only Intel-based server products.

From a numbering perspective the AMD servers did fit into the xSeries range, under the similar x335 and x336 Intel processor products. These numbers were not re-used in the xSeries range to prevent confusion.

IBM eServer xSeries

While most servers used Intel x86 (IA32) processors, the x380, x382, x450 and x455 used the Intel Itanium (IA64) processor.

xSeries range
 IBM eServer xSeries 100, 130, 135, 150
 IBM eServer xSeries 200, 205, 206, 206m, 220, 225, 226, 230, 232, 235, 236, 240, 250, 255, 260
 IBM eServer xSeries 300, 305, 306, 306m, 330, 335, 336, 340, 342, 345, 346, 350, 360, 365, 366, 370, 380, 382
 IBM eServer xSeries 440, 445, 450, 455, 460

Numbering scheme
 100 series are entry-level tower servers
 200 series are tower servers
 300 series are rack-mount servers
 400 series are rack-mount scalable servers

KVM cabling scheme
Many xSeries servers used IBM's C2T cabling scheme for Keyboard/Video/Mouse.

System x

IBM System x range

 IBM System x3105, x3100, x3100 M3, x3100 M4, x3100 M5
 IBM System x3200, x3200 M2, x3200 M3, x3250, x3250 M2, x3250 M3, x3250 M4, x3250 M5, x3250 M6
 IBM System x3300 M3, x3300 M4
 IBM System x3350
 IBM System x3400, x3400 M2, x3400 M3, x3450, x3455
 IBM System x3500, x3500 M2, x3500 M3, x3500 M4
 IBM System x3530 M3, x3530 M4
 IBM System x3550, x3550 M2, x3550 M3, x3550 M4, x3550 M5
 IBM System x3620 M3
 IBM System x3630 M3, x3630 M4
 IBM System x3650, x3650T, x3655, x3650 M2, x3650 M3, x3650 M4, x3650 M4 HD, x3650 M4 BD, 3650 M5
 IBM System x3690 X5
 IBM System x3750 M4
 IBM System x3755, x3755 M3
 IBM System x3800, x3850, x3850 M2, x3850 X5, x3850 X6
 IBM System x3950, x3950 M2, x3950 X5, x3950 X6

Lenovo System x range 
These systems are effectively the same as the previous IBM branded models, but with a Lenovo badge.
 Lenovo System x3100 M5
 Lenovo System x3250 M5, x3250 M6
 Lenovo System x3500 M5
 Lenovo System x3550 M4, x3550 M5
 Lenovo System x3650 M4, x3650 M5
 Lenovo System x3850 X6
 Lenovo System x3950 X6
 Lenovo NextScale
 Lenovo FlexSystem

Lenovo also had its own ThinkServer family of Intel servers. This family is technically less advanced than System x. At the time of this writing, System x is being discontinued and replaced by the Lenovo ThinkSystem family of Intel servers.

Enterprise eX5 architecture

Enterprise X4 architecture

Numbering scheme
2nd digit increments to show capability

3rd digit is a 0 for tower models, and 5 for rack-mount

4th digit is a 0 for Intel processors, and 5 for AMD Opteron.

Models with a T at the end are meant for Telco purposes.

IBM iDataPlex

IBM System x iDataPlex, introduced in 2008, was used by many TOP500 supercomputers (as part of IBM Intelligent Cluster), including SuperMUC, Yellowstone and Stampede. Other smaller installations included SciNet Consortium's General Purpose Cluster

It is an unusual form-factor in that you have two columns of 19" rack servers side-by-side in a single rack. This rack, unlike traditional racks, however was very shallow which is where the space saving came from for large installations. As such it only supports specially designed shallow servers. It was typically deployed in combination with a Rear Door Heat Exchanger (RDHx) to cool the exhaust heat with water.

It was replaced with IBM NeXtScale in 2014.

Components
iDataPlex could be ordered as preconfigured rack tower (System x iDataPlex Rack with optional Rack management appliance), or as independent nodes.

Rack
iDataPlex 100U rack — compact dual rack ((1200x600mm footprint — instead of standard 1280x1050 (2x 42U rack))

Chassis
System x iDataPlex 2U Flex chassis
System x iDataPlex 3U Flex chassis — same as 2U with another coolers and additional storage.
Chassis also compatible with standard racks (with another rails).

Nodes
1U blade servers.
System x iDataPlex dx320 — 20?
System x iDataPlex dx340 — 20??
System x iDataPlex dx360 M1 — 2008, 
System x iDataPlex dx360 M2 — 2009, 
System x iDataPlex dx360 M3 — 201?,
System x iDataPlex dx360 M4 — 2013,

See also
 List of IBM products
 iDataCool — watercooled version of iDataPlex

References

System x
Divested IBM products
System x